Şaban Ağa Mosque is a historical mosque in Muğla Province, Turkey.

Although an ancient site, Stratonicea continued as a settlement during the Turkish era. There is a Seljukid hamam (bath) and an Ottoman mosque. Suleiman I of the Ottoman Empire probably visited the mosque in 1522 during his campaign to Rhodes. Evliya Çelebi, the Ottoman traveler in the 17th century also saw the mosque and named it Tabakhane Mosque. Nevertheless, in 1876 it went under wholescale restoration. The commissioner of the restoration was a certain Şaban Ağa and thus the restored mosque is named after him.

The mosque is a square-plan mosque each side being . Its nartex to the north is supported by 8 wooden columns. There are 16 windows in the main hall. In 2018 the mosque is restored by the governorship of Muğla.

References

Buildings and structures in Muğla Province
Yatağan District
Mosques in Turkey